Syed Ali (also spelled Sayyed Ali, Sayyid Ali, etc.) may refer to:

 Mir Sayyid Ali Hamadani (1314–1384), a Persian Sufi who spread Islam in Kashmir
 Syed Ali (name), a family of Syeds in South Asia
 Syed Ameer Ali (1849–1928), Indian scholar who taught at Aligarh Muslim University
 Syed Ghous Ali Shah (born 1934), former Chief Minister of Sindh, Pakistan
 Syed Ali Shah Geelani (born 1929), politician from Jammu and Kashmir
 Syed Ali Raza, President and Chairman of the National Bank of Pakistan
 Syed Ali (cricketer) (1913–1993), Trinidadian cricketer
 Syed Ali (field hockey, born 1942) (1942–2010), or Syed Mushtaq Ali, field hockey player from India, won 1964 Olympic gold medal
 Syed Ali (field hockey, born 1956), Indian Olympic hockey player
 Syed Ali Ahsan (1922–2002), writer, poet, and professor at the University of Dhaka
 Syed Ali Nawaz Shah Rizvi, former federal Minister in the Cabinet of the government of Pakistan
 Syed Ali Qutab Shah Rizvi, member of the Pakistani Sindh Provincial Assembly in Pakistan
 Syed Ali Naqi Zaidi, poet who used the nom de plume Safi Lakhnavi
 Syed Ali Urooj Naqvi or Ali Naqvi, Pakistani cricketer
 Syed Ali Ashraf, founder of Darul Ihsan University
 Syed Ali, a minor character in the television series 24
 Syed Modasser Ali, ophthalmic surgeon from Bangladesh

See also 
 Sayyid
 Sayyid (name)
 Sa‘id